= Print-it-Yourself =

Organization

Print-it-Yourself (Nyomtass te is)
- Type: Weekly
- Publisher: eDemocracy Workshop Society
- Founded: 2017
- Headquarters: Budapest, Hungary
- Website: https://www.nyomtassteis.hu/

Print-it-Yourself (Hungarian: Nyomtass te is!) is a samizdat-type of publication from Hungary. It was launched in response to the Hungarian government's near-total control over the media in rural areas. Its mission is to provide fact-based, non-partisan news for people living in small towns or villages. Inspired by the Samizdat movement, the weekly newspaper can be downloaded, printed and circulated by volunteer activists. Issues include news stories ignored by the state-controlled outlets.
